Kenmare GAA is a Gaelic Athletic Association club from Kenmare in County Kerry.
The club competes as a joint divisional side with other clubs from the Kenmare area like Templenoe in the underage county championship and as an individual club in senior competitions including the Kerry county senior football championship.

History
The Kenmare Athletic Club was founded on 25 September 1888 when they held a meeting with the newly formed GAA.
The club was originally named after Daniel O'Connell, a famous Kerry politician.
Kenmare played in the inaugural Co. Kerry Championships in Football and Hurling in 1889. The footballers lost that year in the quarter final to eventual champions Laune Rangers.

Hurling

They played in the 1889 Munster Senior Hurling Championship final as Kerry rep
Hurling used to be the dominant game in the Roughty River valley as indicated by the fact that on St. Patrick's Day in 1858 a game of hurling was played between two games called Kenmare Guards in Hoboken, New Jersey, USA.
Kenmare also won the first Kerry Senior Hurling Championship on 19 May 1889 versus Kilmoyley GAA.
In 1895 Kenmare were in another hurling final but this time lost to Kilmoyley GAA.
They won the 1902 County Hurling final against Tralee Celtic, lost the 1904 final to the same team and then won in 1916 and lost the final in 1917. Kenmare's last hurling County title was won in 1942 although they did reach the final 4 more times in 1943, '45, '47 and 1991.

In 1983 & and 1988 Kenmare won the County Minor Championship and lost the 1986 final to Austin Stacks. In 1984 and 1992 All Ireland Hurling Féile na nGael titles were won.

In the 2000s the club won 3 County Intermediate Chamampionships in 2000, 2004 and 2005, they also played in finals in 2008, 2009 and 2010. In 2010 they won another County Minor Championship. They won another county Intermediate title in 2012. In under age hurling Kenmare have for long teamed up with the neighbouring parish Kilgarvan to field teams in County competitions.

Football

In 1940 the County Intermediate Football title was won.

From the 1970s onwards Gaelic Football became the dominant sport in Kenmare.
In 1974 the Kenmare District Team won the Kerry Senior Football Championship.
In 1972 & 1983 Kenmare represented Kerry in the Munster Senior Club Football Championship and on each occasion were narrowly beaten by the club championship specialists Nemo Rangers from Cork
The 1980s proved to be an era for under age successes at football with many Co. competitions being won. U21 Football and a host of other under age hurling and football titles came our way. In 1982 the Club won an All Ireland Minor Football competition.

The club colours today are red & black and these were adopted in the late 1960s; the previous colours being blue & gold. The Club's home ground is Father Breen Park and it has two playing fields with a new synthetic training ground being developed. A new sports hall has also been completed and this should add to the promotion of hurling as indoor hurling has contributed hugely to the present day position of hurling in the greater Kenmare area. In fact Kenmare Kenmare Club pioneered the concept of indoor coaching in hurling and football in Kerry in the late 1970s.

Honours

Football

 Munster Intermediate Club Football Championship
  Winners (1): 2016
 Munster Junior Club Football Championship 
  Winners (1): 2012
 All-Ireland Junior Club Football Championship
  Runners-Up (1): 2013
 Kerry Club Football Championship
  Winners (1): 1983
 Kerry Intermediate Football Championship
  Winners (6): 1940, 1968, 1970, 1972, 1990, 2016
  Runners-Up (3): 1942, 1949, 1991
 Kerry Junior Football Championship
  Winners (1): 2012
 Kenmare District Senior Football Championship 
  Winners (8): 1979, 1982, 1983, 1986, 1987, 1988, 2000, 2003

Hurling

 Kerry Senior Hurling Championship 
  Winners (3): 1889, 1902, 1942
  Runners-Up (8): 1895, 1904, 1910, 1916, 1917, 1945, 1947, 1991
 Kerry Intermediate Hurling Championship 
  Winners (4): 2000, 2004, 2005, 2014
  Runners-Up (4): 2008, 2009, 2010, 2019
 Kerry Under-21 hurling championship
  Winners (4): 1987, 1988, 1989, 2019 (with Kilgarvan/Dr Crokes)
  Runners-Up (3): 1984, 1986, 1999
 Kerry Minor Hurling Championship
  Winners (4): 1959 (with Kilgarvan) 1983, 1988, 2010
  Runners-Up (1): 1986
 Féile na nGael Division 3 Michael Cusack Trophy
  Winners (1): 1984
 Féile na nGael Division 4 Dr Birch Trophy 
  Winners (1): 1992

Notable players
 Stephen O'Brien
 Seán O'Shea
 P. J. McIntyre
 Seamus McIntyre
 Paul O'Connor (Gaelic footballer)
 Mickey O'Sullivan

References

External links
Official Kenmare GAA Club website

Gaelic games clubs in County Kerry
Gaelic football clubs in County Kerry
Hurling clubs in County Kerry
Kenmare